Alexander Lochhead (born 12 May 1866) was a Scottish footballer who played as a left half.

Career
Born in Johnstone, Lochhead played club football for Third Lanark, Morton, Everton and Clyde, and made one appearance for Scotland in 1889. He won the Scottish Cup with Third Lanark in 1889. For Everton he made 6 appearances in the Football League between March and November 1891.

References

1866 births
Year of death missing
Scottish footballers
Scotland international footballers
Arthurlie F.C. players
Third Lanark A.C. players
Greenock Morton F.C. players
Everton F.C. players
Clyde F.C. players
English Football League players
Association football wing halves
People from Johnstone
Place of death missing
Scottish Football League players
Footballers from Renfrewshire